Sir William Rich, 2nd Baronet (c. 1654 – 1711), of Sonning, Berkshire, was an English politician.

He was a son of Sir Thomas Rich, 1st Baronet, and his second wife, Elizabeth, daughter of William Cockayne, alderman and merchant of London.

He was a Member (MP) of the Parliament of England for Reading in 1689–1698 and the period 26 November 1705 – 1708, and for Gloucester in 1698.

References

1654 births
1711 deaths
People from Sonning
Baronets in the Baronetage of England
Members of the Parliament of England (pre-1707) for Gloucester
English MPs 1689–1690
English MPs 1690–1695
English MPs 1695–1698
English MPs 1698–1700
English MPs 1705–1707
Members of the Parliament of Great Britain for English constituencies
British MPs 1707–1708
Members of the Parliament of England (pre-1707) for Reading
Members of the Parliament of Great Britain for Reading